Nachingwea is a district in the Lindi Region of Tanzania. The district is bordered to the north by the Ruangwa District, to the east by the Lindi Rural District, to the south-east by the Mtwara Region, and to the south-west by the Ruvuma Region.

According to the 2002 national census, the Nachingwea District had a population of 162,081.

The Nachingwea Medal is named after this place.

Twinnings
The Anglican Parish of St. Andrew is linked with St. Andrew's Church, Stapleford, Cambridgeshire in the United Kingdom.

Wards

The district is divided administratively into the following 26 wards:

Chiola
Kiegei
Kilima Rondo
Kilimani Hewa
Kipara Mnero
Lionja
Marambo
Matekwe
Mbondo
Mkoka
Mkotokuyana
Mnero Miembeni
Mnerongongo
Mpiruka
Mtua
Naipanga
Naipingo
Namapwia
Namatula
Nambambo
Namikango
Nangowe
Nditi
Ndomoni
Ruponda
Stesheni

References

 
Districts of Lindi Region

ro:Nachingwea